Bay FM 88.0 is a narrowcast FM radio station serving the Tomaree and Tilligerry Peninsulas of Port Stephens in New South Wales, Australia. The station's licence was granted on 29 April 1998 and it transmits from Gan Gan Hill in Nelson Bay. Originally broadcasting on 98.3 MHz, the station's frequency was changed to 99.3 MHz on 8 August 2003. The frequency was changed again on 26 February 2015 to 88.0 MHz.

References

External links
  No. 1
  No. 2

Classic hits radio stations in Australia
Mass media in the Hunter Region
Port Stephens Council
Radio stations in New South Wales
Radio stations established in 1998